Ballyeaston, formerly spelt Ballyistin, is a small village and townland in County Antrim, Northern Ireland. It is 2–3 km north of Ballyclare, on the road to Larne. It lies on the southern hill slopes overlooking Six Mile Water. In the 2001 Census it had a population of 90 people. It is within the Antrim & Newtownabbey Borough Council area.

The village has a very distinctive character and is focused on the junction of three main routes that meet near a medieval parish church. Its buildings cluster between the churches, which are distinctive landmarks, with the strikingly modern facade of First Ballyeaston Presbyterian Church and the unusual bronze cupola of Second Ballyeaston Presbyterian Church. 
The Boy's Brigade Company belongs to 2nd Ballyeaston while the Girl's Brigade belongs to 1st Ballyeaston and boys and girls from both churches attend each.

At the time of the 1859 Ulster revival, the minister of 2nd Ballyeaston was Rev A. Pollock. Reference books state that the revival hit the parish with such power, he died as a result of his strenuous labours. He is buried in the small graveyard behind the church and the inscription on his headstone says that he died in the field with his armour on.

The middle of the village is a tightly knit group of buildings on both sides of the Trenchill Road, a steep and winding road, which forms the village's main street. Most of its buildings are mostly unchanged and the village still retains much of its original character.
At the top of the main street is the old Ballyeaston Flute Band Hall. The band won many competitions before their nearby rivals Ballyclare Victoria Flute Band became famous.

References 

NI Neighbourhood Information System
Draft Belfast Metropolitan Area Plan 2015
Best Kept Village

External links 

First Ballyeaston Presbyterian Church
 His House on the Hill A History of First Ballyeaston
Second Ballyeaston Presbyterian Church
Cowboys from Ballyeaston

Villages in County Antrim
Townlands of County Antrim
Civil parish of Ballycor, County Antrim